Sam Appel (August 8, 1871 – June 18, 1947) was a Mexican-born American character actor of the silent and sound film eras. He appeared in forty films during his 28-year career, mostly in supporting roles.

Filmography

(Per AFI database)

She Hired a Husband  (1918)
The Light of Western Stars  (1918)
The Silk Lined Burglar  (1919)
The Web of Chance  (1919)
La La Lucille  (1920)
Two Kinds of Women  (1922)
The Girl of the Golden West  (1923)
Long Live the King  (1923)
Code of the Sea  (1924)
The Lady Who Lied  (1925)
The White Black Sheep  (1926)
Revenge  (1928)
Love Comes Along  (1930)
Under a Texas Moon  (1930)
Yankee Don  (1931)
Flying Down to Rio  (1933)
Grand Canary  (1934)
The Mighty Barnum  (1934)
Hi, Gaucho!  (1935)
In Caliente  (1935)
Man of Iron  (1935)
Under the Pampas Moon  (1935)
Diamond Jim  (1935)
Rose of the Rancho  (1936)
Ramona  (1936)
A Message to Garcia  (1936)
Anthony Adverse  (1936)
Give Us This Night  (1936)
The Firefly  (1937)
The Last Train from Madrid  (1937)
20 Mule Team  (1940)
Down Mexico Way  (1941)
A Girl, a Guy and a Gob  (1941)
Honolulu Lu  (1941)
Reap the Wild Wind  (1942)
Bad Men of the Border  (1945)
Masquerade in Mexico  (1946)
Gilda  (1946)
Perilous Holiday  (1946)
The Return of Monte Cristo  (1946)

References

External links
 

American male film actors
American male silent film actors
1871 births
1947 deaths
20th-century American male actors
Male actors from Jalisco
Mexican emigrants to the United States
Mexican expatriate actors in the United States